Thomas Edvin Berntsen (born 31 July 1970) is a Norwegian football coach and former football defender. As a player, Berntsen is most notable for his time at Lillestrøm and Vålerenga in Tippeligaen and the Austrian club Bregenz. After his retirement he has been head coach of Lørenskog, Kongsvinger and Strømmen.

Player career 
He was born in Oslo, and started his career in Strømmen before he moved to Lillestrøm where he played 65 matches in Tippeligaen from 1993 to 1996. He then moved to Vålerenga where he played 45 league-matches between 1997 and 1999 and also won the Norwegian Football Cup in 1997.

In 2000, Berntsen moved to the Austrian club SW Bregenz, where his former teammate from Lillestrøm, Jan Ove Pedersen also were playing. After playing three matches in six months for Bregenz, he was loaned out to Bryne where he played five matches in Tippeligaen before he retired after one season with Bærum in 2001 Norwegian Second Division.

Managerial career
In 2006, Berntsen was the head coach of the third-tier club Lørenskog and John Carew's youth club was fighting promotion alongside Notodden. In the decisive match of 2006 Norwegian Second Division, Notodden won 5–3 against Lørenskog at home, and was promoted to Adeccoligaen.

Even though Lørenskog was not promoted, Berntsen was head coach of a second-tier team in 2007 since Kongsvinger hired him as Vegard Skogheim's successor on 6 November 2006. Berntsen led Kongsvinger to a strong fourth place in 2007 Adeccoligaen, two points behind Bryne which played promotion play-off. With two points in the six first matches of the 2008-season, and Kongsvinger positioned at the bottom of the table, Berntsen was fired on 7 May 2008.

On 3 August 2008 he was hired as head coach of his youth-club Strømmen, and saved the club from relegation to Norwegian Third Division. Ahead of the 2009-season, Petter Myhre was named co-coach together with Berntsen. With Berntsen and Myhre as coaches, Strømmen won their 2009 Norwegian Second Division group and was promoted to Adeccoligaen. In 2010 Strømmen finished three points behind the play-off promotion. The next season, Myhre had resigned from the job at Strømmen and was replaced by Andreas Holter which would be leading Strømmen together with Berntsen. In the decisive match of the 2011-season, Strømmen avoided relegation with a 6–1 win against Nybergsund.

In July 2011, Nettavisen named Berntsen as one of the most talented football-coaches in Norway. Berntsen's contract ended after the 2011-season, and he was replaced by Erland Johnsen. In December 2011, Berntsen was linked to the vacant job as head coach of the Tippeliga-club Stabæk, but according to Norwegian TV 2 Berntsen rejected Stabæk's offer. Ahead of the 2013 season he was named as director of sports in Sarpsborg 08 FF.

References 

1970 births
Living people
Footballers from Oslo
Norwegian footballers
Eliteserien players
Strømmen IF players
Lillestrøm SK players
Vålerenga Fotball players
SW Bregenz players
Bryne FK players
Bærum SK players
Norwegian expatriate footballers
Expatriate footballers in Austria
Norwegian expatriate sportspeople in Austria
Norwegian football managers
Kongsvinger IL Toppfotball managers
Strømmen IF managers
Association football defenders
Sarpsborg 08 FF non-playing staff